Christina Johannpeter (24 February 1956 – 22 November 2006) was a Brazilian equestrian. She competed in two events at the 1988 Summer Olympics. She was shot dead in an attempted robbery.

References

External links
 

1956 births
2006 deaths
Brazilian female equestrians
Olympic equestrians of Brazil
Equestrians at the 1988 Summer Olympics
Sportspeople from Rio de Janeiro (city)